Peter Simon Katz is a Canadian singer-songwriter and Twitch streamer.

Katz is a 2012 Juno Award nominee and Emerging Artist of the Year nominee at the Canadian Folk Music Awards. Katz has sold over 15,000 copies of his discs and performed with notable artists such as The Swell Season (The Frames), Dan Mangan, The Good Lovelies, Joel Plaskett, [[Bahamas]], Royal Wood, Lucky Fonz III, Donavon Frankenreiter, Jordan Raycroft, and Garth Hudson from The Band, members of Levon Helm's band (on stage with Glen Hansard's band).

Katz's 2010 studio record First of the Last to Know debuted at No. 1 on the iTunes singer-songwriter charts and features a guest appearance by Academy Award winner Glen Hansard (The Swell Season, 'Once'), Juno Award winners The Good Lovelies and Melissa McClelland (Whitehorse, Sarah Mclachlan). In 2011, Katz released a live CD/DVD entitled Peter Katz and Friends: Live at the Music Gallery. It earned him a Juno nomination for Music DVD of the Year.

Katz released a studio album called Still Mind Still on 24 April 2012. This new collection of songs was recorded mostly live off the floor at a cabin in the woods.

Awards and nominations

Awards
 Best Male Vocalist 2014, Readers' Choice Awards (Now Magazine Toronto)

Nominations
Juno Awards (41st Annual Juno Awards) Music DVD of the Year for Peter Katz & Friends: Live at The Music Gallery
Canadian Folk Music Awards Emerging Artist of the Year Award

Discography

Studio
 The One Minute Mile Man (2004)
 Split (2005)
 More Nights (2007) *Billed as Peter Katz & The Curious*
 First of the Last to Know (2010)
 Still Mind Still (2012) 
 We Are the Reckoning (2015)
 La somme de tous nos efforts (2017)
 City of Our Lives (2020)

Live
 Peter Katz & Friends: Live at The Music Gallery CD/DVD (2011)

Singles
 The Camp Song (2008)
Note: Singer Peter Katz composed the lyrics and music for "The Camp Song"; this song is part of the song repertoire of many summer camps in Canada. This song was composed in 2008 for the International Camping Fellowship congress which took place in Quebec.

Films
 Peter Katz & Friends: Live at The Music Gallery CD/DVD (2011)

References

External links

 

1981 births
Living people
Canadian folk guitarists
Canadian pop guitarists
Rhythm guitarists
Canadian male guitarists
Canadian folk singer-songwriters
Canadian male singer-songwriters
Musicians from Montreal
Writers from Montreal
21st-century Canadian guitarists
21st-century Canadian male singers
Canadian folk-pop singers